The 2012 Yokohama F. Marinos season is Yokohama F. Marinos's 20th season in J.League Division 1 and 33rd season overall in the top flight (counting the Japan Soccer League and participation in the inaugural J.League Cup). It also includes the 2012 J.League Cup and 2012 Emperor's Cup.

Players

Competitions

J.League

League table

Matches

J.League Cup

Emperor's Cup

Kits

References

Yokohama F. Marinos
Yokohama F. Marinos seasons